dumblonde is the debut studio album by American duo Dumblonde, consisting of Aubrey O'Day and Shannon Bex. It was released on September 25, 2015 by Double Platinum, Inc, and is their first musical project since the split of their original girl group Danity Kane in 2014.

Music videos

Commercial performance
The album was a modest success.  It debuted at number 129 on the Billboard 200 chart, with first-week sales of 5,031 copies in the United States.

Critical reception

Track listing

Charts

Release history

References 

2015 albums